The 2018–19 Second Men's League of Serbia is the 14th season of the Second Basketball League of Serbia, the 2nd-tier men's professional basketball league in Serbia.

On 16 March 2020, the Basketball Federation of Serbia temporarily suspended its competitions due to the COVID-19 pandemic. On 2 June, the Federation canceled definitely the season due to the COVID-19 pandemic.

Teams

Promotion and relegation 
Teams promoted to the First League (1st-tier)
Kolubara LA 2003
Napredak JKP
Teams relegated from the First League (1st-tier)
Spartak 
Beovuk 72
Teams promoted from the First Regional League (3rd-tier)
Radnički Beograd
Sveti Đorđe
Fair Play
Železničar
Teams relegated to the First Regional League (3rd-tier)
Vrbas
Rtanj
Žarkovo 
Plana

Venues and locations

Head coaches

League table

See also
 2019–20 Basketball League of Serbia
 2019–20 Basketball Cup of Serbia

References

External links
 Official website of Second Basketball League
 League Standings at eurobasket.com
 League Standings at srbijasport.net

Second Basketball League of Serbia
Serbia
Basketball
Serbia 2